Siah Cheshmeh is a city in West Azerbaijan Province, Iran.

Siah Cheshmeh or Siah Chashmeh may also refer to:

Siah Cheshmeh, Lorestan
Siah Cheshmeh, Tehran